Germany was represented by Katja Ebstein, with the song "Wunder gibt es immer wieder", at the 1970 Eurovision Song Contest, which took place on 21 March 1970 in Amsterdam. "Wunder gibt es immer wieder" was the winner of the German national final, held on 16 February. This was the first of Ebstein's three appearances for Germany at Eurovision; she returned in 1971 and 1980.

Before Eurovision

Ein Lied für Amsterdam
The final was held at the TV studios in Frankfurt, hosted by Marie-Louise Steinbauer. Six songs took part and were voted on in two stages by a 7-member jury. In the first round each judge awarded 1 point to their three favourite songs, and the lowest-scoring three were eliminated. The judges were then asked to award 1 point to their favourite of the three remaining songs, and "Wunder gibt es immer wieder" was the unanimous choice. Other participants included future German representative Mary Roos and three-time Norwegian performer Kirsti Sparboe.

At Eurovision
On the night of the final Ebstein performed 11th in the running order, following Monaco and preceding eventual contest winners Ireland. Along with the Dutch entry, the song was the most contemporary of the evening and Ebstein gave a strong, confident performance which was enthusiastically received by the audience. At the close of voting "Wunder gibt es immer wieder" received 12 points (the highest being 4 from Spain), placing Germany third of the 12 entries, albeit well behind Ireland and runners-up the United Kingdom who had scored 32 and 26 points respectively. This was at the time Germany's highest placement at Eurovision. The German jury awarded its highest mark of 4 to the United Kingdom.

Voting

See also
Germany in the Eurovision Song Contest
Eurovision Song Contest 1970

References

1970
Countries in the Eurovision Song Contest 1970
Eurovision